Dysoxylum papillosum is a tree in the family Meliaceae. The specific epithet  is from the Latin meaning "pimpled", referring to the leaf surface when dry.

Description
The bark is grey-green.

Distribution and habitat
Dysoxylum papillosum is found in Peninsular Thailand, Peninsular Malaysia and Borneo. Its habitat is rain forests at around  altitude.

References

papillosum
Trees of Thailand
Trees of Peninsular Malaysia
Trees of Borneo
Plants described in 1895